Pumiliotoxins (PTXs), are one of several toxins found in the skin of poison dart frogs. The frog species, P. bibronii also produces PTXs to deter predators. Closely related, though more toxic, are allopumiliotoxins, (aPTXs). Other toxins found in the skin of poison frogs include decahydroquinolines (DHQs), izidines, coccinellines, and spiropyrrolizidine alkaloids. Pumiliotoxins are very poisonous in high concentrations. Pumiliotoxins are much weaker than batrachotoxins, ranging between 100 and 1000 times less poisonous. There are three different types of this toxin: A, B and C, of which toxins A and B are more toxic than C. Pumiliotoxins interfere with muscle contraction by affecting calcium channels, causing partial paralysis, difficulty moving, hyperactivity, or death. The median lethal dose of pumiliotoxins A and B is 50 µg / mouse, 20 µg / mouse respectively, while the amount of pumiliotoxin is 200 µg / frog.

See also 
 Allopumiliotoxin
 Histrionicotoxin

References

External links 
 Poison Dart Frogs
 Toxins in Poison Dart Frogs

Alkaloids
Neurotoxins